Lugal-dalu was a Sumerian ruler of the Mesopotamian city of Adab in the mid-3rd millennium BCE, probably circa 2500 BCE.

His name does not appear in the Sumerian King List, but he is known from one of a statue bearing his name. The statue is similar in style to those of other Sumerian kings such as Meannesi or Entemena, sons of En-anna-tum I.

The statue, made of grey gypsum or limestone, was discovered by Abbas Balkis of Affej during the excavations overseen by Edgar James Banks, who described it in an article published in 1904 as "The Oldest Statue in the World" (a claim shared by other statues such as the Urfa Man or the 'Ain Ghazal Statues).

The inscription in archaic cuneiform on the statue reads  è-sar lugal-dalu lugal adab-(ki) "In the temple Esar, Lugaldalu king of Adab", referring to the Esarra Temple in Adab.

References

Sumerian kings
26th-century BC rulers
Kings of Adab